Tadavan (also Romanized as Tādavān; also known as Mādavān, Mādevān, and Taduwān) is a village in Rahgan Rural District, Khafr District, Jahrom County, Fars Province, Iran. At the 2006 census, its population was 1,007, in 280 families.

References 

Populated places in  Jahrom County